The Tetons and the Snake River is a black and white photograph taken by Ansel Adams in 1942, at the Grand Teton National Park, in Wyoming. It is one of his best known and most critically acclaimed photographs.

Analysis
The picture was taken from an elevated point of view and depicts the Snake River in a mountainous valley. A dramatically lit black-and-white photograph depicts a large river, which snakes from the bottom right to the center left of the picture. Dark evergreen trees cover the steep left bank of the river, and lighter deciduous trees cover the right. In the top half of the frame, there is a tall mountain range, dark but clearly covered in snow. The sky is overcast in parts, but only partly cloudy in others, and the sun shines through to illuminate the scene and reflect off the river in these places.

Art market
A mural-sized print of this photograph was sold by $988,000 at Sotheby's New York, on 14 December 2020, the highest price ever reached by a Ansel Adams work.

Public collections
There are prints of this picture in the collections of several art museums, including the National Gallery of Art, Washington, D.C., the Philadelphia Museum of Art, the J. Paul Getty Museum, Los Angeles, and the University of Michigan Museum of Art, in Ann Arbor.

See also
 List of photographs considered the most important

References

Photographs by Ansel Adams
Landscape photographs
Photographs of the United States
1942 in art
1942 photographs
Collections of the National Gallery of Art
Photographs of the J. Paul Getty Museum
Photographs in the collection of the Philadelphia Museum of Art
Grand Teton National Park